Luigi Ulivelli (8 September 1935 – 17 February 2010) was an athlete from Italy, who mainly competed in the long jump.

Biography
He represented his native country at the 1960 Summer Olympics in Rome, Italy. He was born in Corazzano, Pisa. Ulivelli was selected for Italy five times prior to the 1960 Olympics, which was his first major international meet. There he sustained an injury in qualifying that ended his career. In 1955, Ulivelli won the long jump gold at the Mediterranean Games. He has 6 caps in national team from 1954 to 1960.

Olympic results

See also
Italy at the 1955 Mediterranean Games

References

External links
 
Luigi Ulivelli's obituary 

1935 births
2010 deaths
Italian male long jumpers
Athletes (track and field) at the 1960 Summer Olympics
Olympic athletes of Italy
Sportspeople from the Province of Pisa
Mediterranean Games gold medalists for Italy
Athletes (track and field) at the 1955 Mediterranean Games
Mediterranean Games medalists in athletics